Environmental Defenders Office (EDO) is an Australian law centre that encourages and enables litigation, law reform, and community engagement on environmental issues. EDO formed in late 2019 with the merger of eight separate state and territory organisations into one national organisation. Topics of interest to EDO include: climate change, biodiversity, water, and healthy communities.

EDO has eight offices around Australia, located in: Adelaide, Brisbane, Cairns, Canberra, Darwin, Hobart, Perth and Sydney.

Litigation 
EDO represents members of the public and environmental groups in legal action which seeks to protect biodiversity, local communities and Australia's unique landscapes.

EDO lawyers have been involved in some of Australia's biggest environmental legal battles, from the Adani mine and drilling in the Great Australian Bight, to protecting whales in the Antarctic.

Law reform 
EDO lawyers regularly make submissions on aspects of environmental law reform and participate in Federal and State Government inquiries and consultation processes. EDO has advocated strongly for changes to the Environmental Protection and Biodiversity Conservation Act to better protect Australia's unique wildlife and landscapes from ongoing threats.

Community engagement 
EDO conducts workshops, seminars and webinars to inform members of the public about how to participate in the legal process and use the law to protect the environment. The organisation produces factsheets on matters of environmental law and its fortnightly Insight newsletter highlights opportunities to participate in government decision making.

Notable cases

Gloucester Resources Limited v Minister for Planning [2019] NSWLEC 7 
In February 2019, EDO (as EDO NSW) secured a landmark legal victory, with the refusal of the proposed Rocky Hill coal mine in the New South Wales Upper Hunter region. A key factor in the win was the mine's potential impacts on greenhouse gas emissions and climate change.

Bylong Coal Project (SSD 6367) 
EDO (as EDO NSW) represented local community group, the Bylong Valley Protection Alliance, in opposing the 6.5 million tonnes-per-year open cut and underground mine – which would have been built in an area known for its scenic beauty and agricultural productivity. The Independent Planning Commission found that the proposed mine would have unacceptable impacts on groundwater and that the area could not be restored with the same scenic, heritage and natural values after the mine had closed.

Significantly, the panel cited the Rocky Hill case in its decision, describing the emissions from the mine's coal as 'problematical'.  It said the mine was not in the public interest because it was contrary to the principles of intergenerational equity.

The Environment Centre Northern Territory v The Northern Territory Environment Protection Authority and Anor 
In a legal first in 2019, the Environment Centre Northern Territory (ECNT), represented by the EDO (as EDO NT), challenged a permit to allow the clearing of more than 20,000 hectares of Northern Territory native vegetation at Maryfield Station, including on climate change grounds.  The successful case demonstrates the community's ability to hold governments to account for their decisions.

Ralphs Bay Tasmania 
From 2008 to 2010, EDO (as EDO Tasmania) represented community group, Save Ralphs Bay Inc, against a proposed 460-lot canal housing and marina development in a conservation area at Lauderdale.  This would have been the first canal estate proposal in Tasmania.

Mackay Conservation Group Vs Commonwealth of Australia 
In 2015, EDO (as EDO NSW) successfully challenged the Federal Government's approval of Adani's Carmichael coal mine in central Queensland, on behalf of the Mackay Conservation Group (MCG).The case was won over the Federal Environment Minister's failure to take into account the approved conservation advices for the Yakka Skink and the Ornamental Snake. With the consent of the parties, the Court set aside the decision of the Minister because his decision was legally flawed. MCG also alleged that the Federal Environment Minister failed to properly consider the impact of the Carmichael mine on the Great Barrier Reef when he approved the project.

Humane Society International Inc v Kyodo Senpaku Kaisha Ltd 
Acting on behalf of client Humane Society International – Australia (HSI), EDO (as EDO NSW) first took action against Japanese whaling company Kyodo Senpaku Kaisha Ltd (Kyodo) in 2004, to stop it from whaling in breach of Australia's Environment Protection and Biodiversity Conservation Act 1999 (Cth) (EPBC Act).

Kyodo owned ships that conducted whaling in the Australian Whale Sanctuary for the Japanese Whale Research program. There was evidence that Kyodo had killed 3,558 minke whales and 13 fin whales since 2000/2001, with most of those killings taking place in the Sanctuary. The evidence also indicated that Kyodo intended to start taking humpback whales in the 2007/2008 season.

This was a complex case run over several court appearances to establish the jurisdiction of the Federal Court and the right of HSI to serve documents on Kyodo. In 2008, EDO secured a victory when the Federal Court declared that Kyodo was breaching the EPBC Act. The Court granted an injunction to restrain Kyodo from further breaches. HSI representatives travelled to Japan to serve the injunction on Kyodo. But Japan didn't comply with that injunction and continued what it described as 'scientific' whaling in the Sanctuary between 2008 and 2013.

EDOs of Australia 
Environmental Defenders' Offices (EDOs) of Australia was founded in 1996 and consisted of nine independently constituted and managed community environmental law centres located in States and Territories of Australia. In 2014, EDO Victoria left to form Environmental Justice Australia.

In 2019, the eight separate EDOs of Australia agreed to merge into one national organisation, Environmental Defenders Office (EDO Ltd).

Funding and Resources 
The Environmental Defenders' Offices (EDOs) of Australia is a registered charity and has an annual revenue of $11.7 Million Australian (an increase of $2.27M from 2020/21) in 2021/22 financial year, sourced primarily from donations and bequests, and grants.  The EDO dedclared 83 FTE Employees and over 100 volunteers, with $9.4M (AUD) spent on staff expenses.  The EDO does not share details of grants or donors, but have thanked contributors including the Graeme Wood Foundation, the Lenko Family Foundation, and the McKinnon Family Foundation.  The EDO also receives some funding from various state and territory governments for work providing access to justice and legal services to people in the broad Australian community.

In the 2022 Federal Budget, the Labor Federal Government committed $9.8 million has been allocated over four years to the Environmental Defenders Office and Environmental Justice Australia to 
"improve access to justice and legal assistance for Australians wanting to uphold environmental laws and protect Australia's environment and heritage."

See also 
Environmental law
Environmental Defenders Office NSW
Environmental Defenders Office Qld

References

External links 
EDO Ltd 
Environmental Justice Australia

Environmental organisations based in Australia
1996 establishments in Australia